The Ambassador Extraordinary and Plenipotentiary of the Russian Federation to the Republic of Latvia is the official representative of the President and the Government of the Russian Federation to the President and the Government of Latvia.

The ambassador and his staff work at large in the Embassy of Russia in Riga. There are consulates general in Daugavpils and Liepaja.

History of diplomatic relations

The territory occupied by Latvia had been part of the Russian Empire since the eighteenth century. In the aftermath of the First World War and the collapse of the empire following the Russian Revolution in 1917, Latvia declared independence on 18 November 1918. Diplomatic relations were established between Latvia and the Russian Soviet Federative Socialist Republic to Latvia on 11 August 1920, and Yakov Ganetsky was appointed the first Plenipotentiary representative on 31 August that year. Representation continued until the Soviet occupation of Latvia in 1940, after which Latvia was de facto part of the USSR for the remainder of the existence of the Soviet Union, with the exception of a period of occupation by Nazi Germany between 1941 and 1944 during the Second World War. Soviet forces re-occupied Latvia in 1944, after which Latvia became a constituent part of the Soviet Union as the Latvian Soviet Socialist Republic.

As part of the dissolution of the Soviet Union in 1991, Latvia's secession was recognized by the State Council of the Soviet Union on 6 September 1991. Diplomatic relations with Russia were established on 4 October 1991.

List of representatives (1920 – present)

Representatives of the Russian Soviet Federative Socialist Republic to Latvia (1920 – 1923)

Representatives of the Union of Soviet Socialist Republics to Latvia (1923 – 1940)

Representatives of the Russian Federation to Latvia (1992 – present)

References

 
Russia
Latvia